Kay "Red" Todd Jr. (February 10, 1910 – June 12, 1944) was an American football player and ice hockey player who competed at the 1932 Summer Olympics. He also played hockey for Yale University.

Personal life
Todd served in the United States Army during World War II. During the Normandy landings on June 6, 1944, he was part of the paratrooper force sent behind German lines. He was killed on June 12 attacking a machine-gun post during the Battle of Normandy.

Hockey statistics

References

1910 births
1944 deaths
Ice hockey people from Saint Paul, Minnesota
Players of American football from Saint Paul, Minnesota
American football halfbacks
American football players at the 1932 Summer Olympics
American ice hockey forwards
Yale Bulldogs men's ice hockey players
United States Army personnel killed in World War II
Paratroopers
Deaths by firearm in France